Isabel de Warenne, 4th Countess of Surrey (c. 113712 July 1203) was an English peer. She was the only surviving heir of William de Warenne, 3rd Earl of Surrey, and his wife, Adela, the daughter of William III of Ponthieu.

Life

She was the great-granddaughter of the first Norman earl, William, and his Flemish wife Gundred. When her father died in the Holy Land about 1148 she inherited the earldom of Surrey and was married in around 1153 to William of Blois, the younger son of King Stephen, who became earl in her right. The marriage occurred at a critical moment in The Anarchy as part of the king's attempt to control the de Warenne lands.

The couple did not have any children and after William's death in 1159, King Henry II's younger brother, William FitzEmpress, sought her hand in 1162 or 1163, but Thomas Becket refused a dispensation from affinity on the grounds of consanguinity. In April 1164, the countess married Hamelin of Anjou, a natural half-brother of King Henry, who became jure uxoris Earl of Surrey. The countess lived an unusually long life, dying at the age of 66.

Family

She and William of Blois had no children. Isabelle and her second husband Hamelin had four surviving children:

William, later 5th Earl of Surrey (1166–1240)
Ela (born c. 1170, date of death unknown), married first Robert of Naburn and secondly William FitzWilliam of Sprotborough.
Isabel, married first Robert de Lacy and secondly Gilbert de l'Aigle, Lord of Pevensey.
Matilda, married first Henry, Count of Eu and Lord of Hastings and secondly Henry de Stuteville.

Ancestry

References

12th-century births
1203 deaths
Hereditary women peers
Burials at Lewes Priory
104
Countesses of Boulogne
Isabel
13th-century English people
13th-century English women
12th-century English people
12th-century English women
12th-century English landowners
Women landowners